Juan Pablo Paz (born 1959) is an Argentinian physicist that works in the field of quantum computing. A research scientist currently working at the University of Buenos Aires, he has also worked at the Los Alamos National Laboratory in the United States.

Biography 
Juan Pablo Paz was born in Buenos Aires in 1959. He studied at the University of Buenos Aires, where he got his Master and Ph.D. degrees and then worked as researcher, teacher, and director of the Physics department of his faculty.

He has worked as well in the Los Alamos National Laboratory. Between 1984 and 2004 he was married with Silvina Ponce Dawson (who is also a physicist) with whom he had two children.

Research 
Paz has worked in the quantum theory of error correction, and has developed a number of techniques to correct errors in this kind of computers. He has also used quantum computer to simulate chaotic systems, in the context of chaos theory.

In 2002, alongside César Miguel and Marcos Saraceno, he developed a program that allows efficient spectroscopy and tomography using a quantum computer, establishing for the first time an analogy between these tasks.

Awards 
 Ernesto E. Galloni Award in Physics, 1994
 International Fellow, Santa Fe Institute, 2001-2003
 Guggenheim Fellow, 2004
 W. Bessel Award, 2006. Alexander von Humboldt Foundation
 Bunge & Born Foundation, 2010
 TWAS Prize in Physics, 2012
 Bernardo Houssay Award and Researcher of the Nation, 2014

References

External links
Un paso hacia la computación cuántica, Axxon, July 8, 2002 (spanish)
Nueva visita a las computadoras cuánticas, by Leonardo Moledo, Página 12, October 28, 2000 (spanish)
Personal website
2001 Lecture

Argentine physicists
1959 births
Living people
TWAS laureates
Santa Fe Institute people
Los Alamos National Laboratory personnel